The Tupolev Tu-80 was a Soviet prototype for a longer-ranged version of the Tupolev Tu-4 bomber, an unlicensed, reverse engineered copy of the Boeing B-29 Superfortress. It was cancelled in 1949 in favor of the Tupolev Tu-85 program which offered even more range. The sole prototype was used in various test programs before finally being used as a target.

Development
The Tu-80 was designed as a modernized and enlarged Tu-4 with greater range. This was to be achieved by the use of more fuel-efficient engines, better aerodynamics and added fuel tanks. Work began on the design in February 1948 and this was confirmed by a Council of Ministers order of 12 June that required the prototype be ready for State acceptance trials in July 1949.

The forward portion of the fuselage was redesigned with an airliner-style stepped windscreen and the fuselage was lengthened by almost  which allowed the bomb bays and their doors to be lengthened. The radar and its operator were moved into the forward pressurized compartment and the radar itself was located in the "chin" position in a new streamlined fairing. The engine nacelles were redesigned with smaller cross-sections with less drag. Originally, Shvetsov ASh-2TK or Dobrynin VD-3TK engines were considered, but neither engine was ready so the Shvetsov ASh-73TKFN was used. Fully feathering propellers were also used. All of these changes increased the lift/drag ratio to 18 from the 17.0 of the Tu-4.

Construction of the Tu-80 began in November 1948, using as many Tu-4 components as possible to speed up construction, but the first flight was not until 1 December 1949, after the Council of Ministers had canceled the program on 16 September 1949 in favor of the Tu-85 which was expected to have much better performance. The Tu-80 became a research aircraft, testing reversible-pitch propellers and structural deformation in heavy aircraft, before eventually became a target on a bombing and gunnery range.

Specifications

See also

References

Bibliography
 
 
 

Tu-0080
1940s Soviet bomber aircraft
Abandoned military aircraft projects of the Soviet Union
Soviet Union–United States relations
Four-engined tractor aircraft
Tu-80
Mid-wing aircraft
Aircraft first flown in 1949
Four-engined piston aircraft